Anant Sadashiv Patwardhan was an Indian politician from the state of the Madhya Pradesh.
He represented Dewas Vidhan Sabha constituency in Madhya Pradesh Legislative Assembly by winning General election of 1957.

References 

Year of birth missing
Year of death missing
People from Madhya Pradesh
Madhya Pradesh MLAs 1957–1962
People from Dewas
People from Dewas district
Indian National Congress politicians from Madhya Pradesh